Bremen-Sebaldsbrück is a railway station located in Bremen, Germany. The station is located on the Bremen–Hanover railway. The train services are operated by NordWestBahn. The station has been part of the Bremen S-Bahn since December 2010.

Train services
The following services currently call at the station:

Bremen S-Bahn services  Bremen-Farge - Bremen-Vegesack - Bremen - Verden

References

Railway stations in Bremen (state)
Bremen S-Bahn